Brady Robert Barr (born 4 January 1963) is a herpetologist and host of Nat Geo WILD's Dangerous Encounters with Brady Barr.  He began employment with National Geographic in 1997. Barr has also been the host for two other series, Reptile Wild and Croc Chronicles.

Career

A native of Fort Worth, Texas, Barr graduated from Indiana University School of Education with a B.S. in Science Education and later became a high school teacher. After earning a PhD at the University of Miami, Barr became the first known herpetologist to have captured all 23 extant species of crocodilians in his career.

Barr is the author of a children's book about citizen science and American crocodiles,.

In 2012, Barr testified at the Subcommittee Hearing on HR511: To prohibit the importation of various species of constrictor snakes after he approached the U.S. Association of Reptile Keepers (USARK) to offer his expertise.

References

1963 births
Living people
American herpetologists
University of Miami alumni
People from Fort Worth, Texas
Indiana University alumni